The 2017 Jharkhand mob lynchings were cases of mob lynching that took place in May 2017 in Kolhan division, Jharkhand, India. At least nine people were killed, including 4 Muslim cattle traders, in four different incidents.

Incidents
On 18 May 2017, a group of four Muslim cattle traders passing through Sobhapur village were lynched to death by a violent mob. The group had set off the night before from Haldipokhar, East Singhbhum, for Rajnagar in Seraikela-Kharsawan district to buy cattle.

In the evening of 18 May, three men were dragged out of a house and beaten to death by a mob in Nagadih, a tribal village in East Singhbhum. An old woman was also assaulted and seriously injured.

On 21 May 2017, Munna Ansari, a 39-year old Muslim resident of Kanke in Ranchi district, was beaten by a mob while he was travelling from Kolkata to Ranchi. Ansari who was supposed to change a bus from Purulia, boarded the wrong bus to Adityapur instead. A few hours later, a group of men surrounded him near Beldih Basti who interrogated him about his identity and residence. The mob hardly allowed Ansari to speak and beat him up so violently that he was rushed to a hospital. He was later discharged from hospital on 22 May.

Reaction
The villagers belonging to the Muslim community called for a bandh and protested in a suburb of Jamshedpur, demanding immediate arrest of the culprits involved in the lynching of four cattle traders. Eighteen people were arrested in connection with the lynching and the subsequent violence.

On 21 May, the National Human Rights Commission of India issued a notice to the Director-General of Jharkhand Police over the mob lynchings and sought a detailed report in the matter within four weeks.

See also
2016 Jharkhand mob lynching
Tabrez Ansari lynching

References

Anti-Muslim violence in India
2017 in India
Lynching deaths in India
2010s in Jharkhand
Vigilantism
Hinduism-motivated violence in India
Religiously motivated violence in India
People murdered in Jharkhand